Dastgeer Sahib is a Sufi shrine located in Khanyar, Srinagar, Kashmir.

History
Dastgeer Sahib is a 200-year-old shrine situated in Khanyar. Sheikh Syed Abdul Qadir Jelani stayed there. It has the old Quran written by Ali Ibn Abi Talib A.S, and the relic which is locally called Mouia Pak, a hair strand of Abdul Qadir Gilani. It was constructed in 1806 and expanded in 1877 by Khwaja Sanaullah Shawl.

It is the center of the activity hub of the Khanyar and is surrounded by a large market. On the Urs or birth date of the Abdul Qadir Gilani(R.A), thousands of people from all over Kashmir go there to pray to Allah and watch the ziyarat.

There are five graves situated inside it. It is said that it is of the one of the students of qadiri Silsilla Sheikh Syed Abdul Qadir Jelani.

Fire

The shrine was badly damaged in a fire on 25 June 2012. The relics of the saint that were located inside a fireproof vault were not damaged. The shrine has been restored to its original state.

References

Sufi shrines in India
Buildings and structures in Srinagar